Steve McClure (born 25 July 1970) is a British rock climber and climbing author, who is widely regarded as Britain's leading and most important sport climber for a period that extends for over two decades, starting from the late 1990s. In 2017, he created Rainman, Britain's first-ever  sport route, and by that stage was responsible for developing the majority of routes graded  and above in Britain.  McClure has also been one of the most successful British traditional climbers, and British onsight climbers (in both sport climbing and traditional climbing).

Climbing career
McClure started climbing early as both parents were keen climbers, and by age 16 was onsighting E6.  McClure did not take up British sport climbing until he was 24, and said that it took him time to adapt saying, "[in sport] it's possible to commit 100%, rather than considering the risk and the danger [in traditional]".  He went from onsighting E6 to onsighting ; within one year was doing  redpoints in a day; within 2 years he was doing ; within 4 years, at age 28, he was doing . As a late-comer to sport climbing, McClure had mixed form in competitions, retiring in 2004.

For the next two decades, McClure dominated British sport climbing, repeating the hardest routes of his predecessors such as Ben Moon's Hubble (8c+/9a), and Jerry Moffatt's Evolution (8c+), and developing Britain's first 9a routes. In 2000, he freed Britain's third , Ben Moon's Northern Lights. In 2007, McClure created Britain's second  route, Overshadow. In June 2017, aged 46, McClure completed his long term project Rainman, considered to be Britain's first-ever  route, with PlanetMountain saying: "Steve McClure is the climber who almost single-handedly has dictated the pace of cutting-edge sport climbing in the UK. Practically all the hardest climbs in the country are his, starting in 1998 with his 9a Mutation at Ravens Tor".

While McClure is best known for sport climbing, he is one of the few who have repeated the hardest traditional climbing routes in Britain, including Dave MacLeod's Rhapsody (E11 7a, 5.14c R/X) in 2008, and Neil Gresham's Lexicon (E11 7a, 5.14a R) in 2021.  He has also freed projects such as GreatNess Wall (E10 7a), in 2019.  On traditional climbing risk, he had said: "Routes like Harder Faster, Indian Face, The Bells The Bells and Meshuga just fill me with dread, and I have absolutely no drive to do them at all.", and, " I like the technical challenge of placing gear, but I'm not interested in death routes".

In 2009, he was unlucky not to become the first British climber to onsight an  failing at the final move of Amistad in Rodellar, Spain. In 2019, McClure made the first onsight of Nightmayer (E8 6c), one of the hardest onsights of a traditional climb in Britain, and in 2021, he flashed Impact Day (E8 6c). McClure's first British onsight of Ron Fawcett's Strawberries (E7 6b) in 2014, was also considered notable.

In 2013, McClure became the first-ever British nominee for a Salewa Rock Award at the 2013 Arco Rock Legends, and a citation calling him: "a true legend of this sport and his nomination rewards a lifetime of cutting-edge climbing"; the four nominees were Steve McClure, Chris Sharma, Alex Megos, and Adam Ondra (who won).

Notable ascents

Sport routes
 1996: Evolution , Raven Tor. Fourth ascent of Jerry Moffatt's 1995 test-piece, which is still a coveted route.
 1998: Mutations , Raven Tor. First ascent. The 2nd 9a in Britain.  Only repeated 23-years later by Will Bosi, despite attempts by Alex Megos and Chris Sharma, who suggested .
 2000: Northern Lights , Kilnsey. First ascent. The 3rd 9a in Britain, and repeated by Adam Ondra (2010), and Alex Megos (2016).
 2002: Indian Summer , Kilnsey. First British onsight of an 8b+ sport climb.
 2003: Rainshadow , Malham Cove. First ascent. Has become one of the most well-regarded and coveted 9a routes in Britain.
 2007: Overshadow , Malham Cove. First ascent. The 2nd 9a+ in Britain; first repeat by Adam Ondra in 2011, who confirmed the grade as a "hard" .
 2008: North Star , Kilnsey. First ascent; extension of Northern Exposure , and repeated by Adam Ondra in 2010 who confirmed the grade.
 2009: Stevolution , Raven Tor. First ascent.
 2009: Hubble , Raven Tor. Circa fifth ascent of Ben Moon's 1990 watershead route in British sport climbing history; now considered closer to 9a.
 2013: Batman , Malham Cove. First ascent, links up with Bat Route .
 2017: Rainman , Malham Cove. First ascent; links Raindogs  to Rainshadow , to finish directly. Considered to be the first 9b in Britain.

Traditional routes
 2004: Elder Statesman (HXS 7a, 5.14), Curbar Edge, Peak District. First ascent; McClure used three ropes for protection; featured in the films Hard Grit and  The Elder Statesman.
 2008: Rhapsody (E11 7a, 5.14c R/X), Dumbarton Rock. 2nd ascent after Dave MacLeod's FFA in 2006; one of the hardest traditional routes in the world.
 2011: The Quarryman (E8 7a), Twll Mawr, Dinorwic quarry, Llanberis. First single-day ascent of all 4-pitches of Johnny Dawes's 1986 slate test-piece.
 2014: Strawberries (E7 6b), Tremadog. North Wales.  First British onsight of the classic Ron Fawcett route.
 2015: Choronzon (E10 7a), East Range, Pembrokeshire. 2nd ascent after Neil Mawson's FFA in 2014.
 2015: Muy Caliente! (E9/10 6c), Stennis Ford, Pembrokeshire. 6th ascent after Tim Emmett's FFA in 2010.
 2019: Nightmayer (E8 6c). Dinas Cromlech. First onsight and 4th ascent of Steve Mayer's 1990s route.
 2019: GreatNess Wall (E10 7a), Nesscliffe. First ascent of a project that had been tried unsuccessfully by several parties.
 2021: Impact Day (E8 6c). Pavey Ark, Lake District. First onsight flash and 2nd ascent of Dave Birkett's 1999 FFA.
 2021: Lexicon  (E11 7a, 5.14a R), Pavey Ark, Lake District. 2nd ascent just a few weeks after Neil Gresham's FFA in September 2021; McClure took a 70 foot fall.

Bibliography
Beyond Limits - A life through climbing (Steve McClure), November 2014. .
Sport Climbing +: The Positive Approach to Improve Your Climbing (Steve McClure, Adrian Berry), December 2006. .

Filmography
 Documentary on McClure: 
 Documentary on freeing Overshadow:

See also
History of rock climbing
List of first ascents (sport climbing)

Notes

References

External links
 
 

 Steve McClure on Rainman 9b, UKClimbing (interview, 2017) 

1970 births
Living people
People from Saltburn-by-the-Sea
British rock climbers
Sportspeople from North Yorkshire
English male non-fiction writers
21st-century English male writers
English non-fiction outdoors writers